The Germanic languages include some 58 (SIL estimate) languages and dialects that originated in Europe; this language family is part of the Indo-European language family.  Each subfamily in this list contains subgroups and individual languages.

The standard division of Germanic is into three branches:
 East Germanic languages
 North Germanic languages
 West Germanic languages
They all descend from Proto-Germanic, and ultimately from Proto-Indo-European.

South Germanic languages, an attempt to classify some of the West Germanic languages into a separate group, is rejected by the overwhelming majority of scholars.

† denotes extinct languages.

West Germanic

Continental West Germanic

 High German languages
 Old High German† & Middle High German†
 Upper German
 High Franconian
 East Franconian German
 South Franconian German
 Alemannic German
 Swabian German, including Stuttgart
 Low Alemannic German, including the area of Lake Constance and Basel German
 Alsatian
 Colonia Tovar German
 Central Alemannic
 Argentinien-schwyzertütsch
 Walser German
 High Alemannic German, including Zürich German and Bernese German
 Highest Alemannic German, including the Bernese Oberland dialects and Walliser German
 Bavarian
 Northern Bavarian (including Nuremberg)
 Central Bavarian (including Munich and Vienna)
 Southern Bavarian (including Innsbruck, Klagenfurt, and Bolzano, Italy)
 Mócheno
 Cimbrian
 Central German languages
 West Central German
 Amana German
 Ripuarian Franconian
 Moselle Franconian
 Hunsrik
 Luxembourgish
 Rhine Franconian
 Palatine
 North Hessian
 Central Hessian
 East Hessian
 Pennsylvania German (spoken by the Amish and other groups in southeastern Pennsylvania
 East Central German
 Thuringian
 Upper Saxon
 North Upper Saxon-South Markish
 Silesian
 High Prussian
 Hutterite German aka "Tirolean"
 Yiddish (with a significant influx of vocabulary from Hebrew and other languages, and traditionally written in the Hebrew alphabet)
 Eastern Yiddish
 Western Yiddish
 Halcnovian
 Wymysorys (with a significant influence from Low Saxon, Dutch, Polish, and Scots)
Low Franconian languages
 Old Frankish†
 Old Low Franconian†
 Old East Low Franconian†
 Limburgian
 Old West Low Franconian† / Old Dutch†
 Middle Dutch†
 Modern Dutch
 West Flemish
 East Flemish
 Zeelandic
 Central Dutch
 Hollandic
 Zuid-Gelders
 Brabantine
 Brusselian
 Clevian
 Stadsfries dialects
 Afrikaans (with a significant influx of vocabulary from other languages)

Low German languages
 Old Saxon† & Middle Low German†
 West Low German
 Northern Low Saxon
 East Frisian Low Saxon
 Westphalian
 Eastphalian
 East Low German
 Brandenburgisch
 Mecklenburgisch-Vorpommersch
 Middle Pomeranian
 East Pomeranian
 Low Prussian
 Plautdietsch (Mennonite Low German, used also in many other countries)

North-Sea Germanic
 Anglo-Frisian
 Old Frisian†
 Frisian
 West Frisian languages
 West Frisian language (spoken in the Netherlands)
 Clay Frisian (Klaaifrysk)
 Wood Frisian (Wâldfrysk)
 Noardhoeks
 South Frisian (Súdhoeks)
 Southwest Frisian (Súdwesthoeksk)
 Schiermonnikoogs
 Hindeloopers
 Aasters
 Westers
 East Frisian language (spoken in Germany)
 Saterland Frisian
 Wangerooge Frisian†
 Wursten Frisian†
 North Frisian language (spoken in Germany)
 Mainland Frisian
 Mooring
 Goesharde Frisian
 Wiedingharde Frisian
 Halligen Frisian
 Karrharde Frisian
 Island Frisian
 Söl'ring
 Fering
 Öömrang
 Heligolandic
 Anglic
 English language (dialects)
 Old English†
 Middle English† (significant influx of words from Old French)
 Early Modern English†
 Modern English
 British English (English English, including Northern English, East Midlands English, West Midlands English, Southern English, and others, Welsh English, Scottish English) and Irish English
 North American English (American English and Canadian English)
 Australian English and New Zealand English
 South African English
 Zimbabwean English
 South Asian English (Indian English)
 South-East Asian English (Philippine English, Singapore English, Malaysian English)
 West Indian English (Caribbean English)
 Lowland Scots
 Early Scots†
 Middle Scots†
 Modern Scots
 Glasgow
 Northern Scots
 North Northern
 Black Isle and Easter Ross
 Cromarty†
 Mid Northern (North East Scots or the Doric)
 South Northern
 Central Scots
 North East Central
 South East Central
 West Central
 South West Central
 Southern Scots
 Insular Scots
 Orcadian
 Shetland dialect
 Ulster Scots
 Yola†
 Fingallian†

North Germanic

Ancestral classification
 Proto-Norse †
 Old Norse †
 West Scandinavian
 Old West Norse †
 Old Norwegian †
 Middle Norwegian †
 Modern Norwegian dialects
  (Northern Norway)
  (Bodø)
 Brønnøy dialect (Brønnøy)
  (Helgeland)
 other dialects
 Trøndersk (Trøndelag)
  (Fosen)
  (Härjedalen)
 Jämtland dialects (Jämtland province) (wide linguistic similarity with the Trøndersk dialects in Norway)
 Meldal dialect (Meldal)
  (Tydal)
 other dialects
 Vestlandsk (Western and Southern Norway)
 West (Vestlandet)
 Bergen dialect (Bergen)
  (Haugesund)
  (Jæren district)
  (Karmøy)
  (Nordmøre)
  (Sunndalsøra)
  (Romsdal)
 Sandnes dialect (Sandnes)
 Sogn dialect (Sogn district)
  (Sunnmøre)
 Stavanger dialect (Stavanger)
  (Midhordland district)
 South (Sørlandet)
 Arendal dialect (Arendal region)
  (Upper Setesdal, Valle)
 other dialects
  (Eastern Norway)
  (Lowland districts)
 Vikværsk dialects (Viken district)
  (Andebu)
  (Bohuslän province) (influenced by Swedish in retrospective)
  (Grenland district)
 Oslo dialect (Oslo)
  (Mid-east districts)
  (Ringerike district)
  (Hønefoss)
  (Ådal)
  (Opplandene district)
 Hedmark dialects (Hedmark)
  (Solør)
  (Hadeland district)
  (Viken district)
 Särna-Idre dialect (Särna and Idre)
  (Midland districts)
 Gudbrandsdal dialect (Gudbrandsdalen, Oppland and Upper Folldal, Hedmark)
 Hallingdal-Valdres dialects (Hallingdal, Valdres)
 
 Valdris dialect (Valdres district)
 Telemark-Numedal dialects (Telemark and Numedal)
 
 other dialects
 Old Faroese †
 Middle Faroese †
 Modern Faroese
 Norn †
 Caithness Norn †
 Orkney Norn †
 Shetland Norn †
 Old Icelandic †
 Middle Icelandic †
 Modern Icelandic
 Greenlandic Norse †
 East Scandinavian
 Old East Norse †
 Old Danish †
 Middle Danish †
 Modern Danish
 Bornholmsk
 Island Danish
 Jutlandic/Jutish
 North Jutlandic
 East Jutlandic
 West Jutlandic
 South Jutlandic
 Gøtudanskt (Faroese street Danish)
 Urban East Norwegian (generally considered a Norwegian dialect)
 Old Swedish †
 Modern Swedish
 Norrland dialects
 Svealand Swedish
 Dalecarlian
 Elfdalian (considered a Swedish Sveamål dialect, but has official orthography and is, because of a lower degree of mutual intelligibility with Swedish, considered a separate language by many linguists, see p. 6 in this reference)
 Götamål (Götaland)
 East Swedish
 Swedish dialects in Ostrobothnia
 Other dialects of Finland Swedish
Estonian Swedish
South Swedish
 Gutnish
 Old Gutnish †
 Modern Gutnish

Alternate classification of contemporary North Germanic languages based on mutual intelligibility
 Insular Scandinavian
 Icelandic
 Faroese
 Continental Scandinavian
 Danish
 Norwegian
 Swedish

East Germanic
 East Germanic†
 Burgundian†
 Gothic†
 Crimean Gothic†
 Vandalic†

External links
 Germanic language tree

References

Germanic languages
Germanic